Gymnopilus mitis is a species of mushroom-forming fungus in the family Hymenogastraceae.

Description

Habitat and distribution
Gymnopilus mitis has been found growing on wood in Maine, Michigan, and California, during the months of July and December.

See also

List of Gymnopilus species

References

mitis
Fungi of North America
Fungi described in 1969
Taxa named by Lexemuel Ray Hesler